Vasilică Cristocea (born 27 July 1980) is a Romanian former football player who played as a midfielder. He made 249 appearances in Liga I.

Career
Cristocea made his debut playing for Carsium Hârşova's youth teams, before joining Farul Constanţa in 1999. He spent most of his career at Constanţa's team, playing 156 matches and scoring 26 goals until 2006, when he was transferred by Steaua București.

Together with Steaua București he won the 2005–06 Divizia A season and played several matches in UEFA Champions League and UEFA Cup. In 2008, he was loaned to Ceahlăul Piatra Neamţ.

In 2009, he returned to Farul Constanţa where he played for one season before moving to the other town's team, Viitorul Constanţa. He played three years for Viitorul and in July 2013 he joined the Liga I team, Universitatea Cluj.

Honours
Steaua București
Liga I: 2005–06
Supercupa României: 2006

References

External links
 
 
 

1980 births
Living people
People from Hârșova
Romanian footballers
Romania under-21 international footballers
Liga I players
FCV Farul Constanța players
FC Steaua București players
FC Steaua II București players
Association football midfielders
CSM Ceahlăul Piatra Neamț players
FC Viitorul Constanța players
FC Universitatea Cluj players